Amerikana is a comedy-drama film written and directed by James Merendino. A sort of free homage-remake of Easy Rider (1969), it was the thirteenth film created under Dogme 95 rules. Although produced in 2001, it wasn't released until 2007.

Plot
When philosophy student  Peter (Goorjian) is abandoned by his Danish girlfriend in Los Angeles, his friend Chris (Duval) invites him to South Dakota to claim a Harley Davidson he has inherited from an uncle. After he finds out it is an Italian Vespa, Chris decides to take it to L.A. anyway with a reluctant Peter, and they embark on a cross-country journey that allows them to explore the USA and discover the nature of people and their own contradictions.

References

External links

Dogme 95 films
American independent films
Films directed by James Merendino
Films produced by Peter Aalbæk Jensen
2000s English-language films
2000s American films